Perfect Match is an American game show that was hosted by Bob Goen and announced by Johnny Gilbert, which aired from January 13 to September 12, 1986, in syndication. The game featured three married couples answering questions about their spouses to win money. 

Perfect Match was Goen's first game show and the second game show to be distributed by Lorimar-Telepictures after Lorimar Productions purchased Telepictures in 1985. The show was also produced by XPTLA, Inc, whose show The $1,000,000 Chance of a Lifetime launched one week before Perfect Match.

The Perfect Match had also been the name of an earlier TV game show, which aired in syndication in 1967-68 and featured a computer dating theme.

Development
A year before Perfect Match debuted, Telepictures developed another game show, Catch Phrase, and sold it to stations with what they called an "insurance policy". The condition was that if a station wanted to buy Catch Phrase and the show was not able to make it through the 1985-86 season, Telepictures would give the station another program to air at no additional cost to it. Catch Phrase faced ratings trouble from the start, and in November 1985 Lorimar-Telepictures commissioned a pilot for what was initially called Make a Match, with Jim Lange hosting. The pilot was well received by company executives and Lorimar-Telepictures decided to put the series into production, but before production began the name of the show was changed to Perfect Match.

Entering December 1985, according to a report in Broadcasting Magazine, Lorimar-Telepictures vice president Peter Temple said the ratings for Catch Phrase were showing "no upside".. Telepictures president Dick Robertson confirmed this in a videotaped message he sent to stations around this same time, saying that the lack of growth in the ratings proved the show "wasn't working" and that the company was taking the drastic step of putting the insurance policy into effect immediately.

As such, Catch Phrase ceased production after sixty-five episodes and its last episode aired on January 10, 1986. The stations airing the now-cancelled Catch Phrase began receiving Perfect Match on January 13, 1986. Since there was such a quick turnaround between pilot and production, there had not been an official host named when Robertson announced the series' debut; since Lange was already committed to hosting The $1,000,000 Chance of a Lifetime, the producers opted to bring in Bob Goen, who at the time had been working for ESPN as a correspondent.

Gameplay

Main game
Three married couples attempted to match their spouse's answers to questions they had answered before the game. Each team began with a bankroll of $200. For each question, the spouse's answer to it was shown to the home viewers. Prior to giving an answer, the other spouse wagered an amount between $10 and their entire bankroll based on his or her ability to provide a matching response. Providing the same response added the wager to their bankroll but a non-matching response meant that their wager was deducted from the bankroll. Three questions were played.

Bonus round
Each of the couples competed against each other by predicting how their spouses would write "love letters" to the other. These were written before the show. Each letter contained three missing words and/or phrases. The husbands read their letters first, and for each match the wives made, their team earned $100. The process was reversed and repeated with each match the husbands made worth $200.

The couple who had the most money at the end of the round won an additional $1,000; however, each couple kept any money earned throughout the game. If two or three couples were tied at the end of the game, the $1,000 was split between the tied couples and a three way did happen at least once. But if any couple matched all of the words in their love letters, they won a total of $5,000.

References

1986 American television series debuts
1986 American television series endings
1980s American game shows
Television series by Lorimar Television
Television series by Warner Bros. Television Studios
Television series by Lorimar-Telepictures